Cherry T. Chevapravatdumrong (born 1977), also known as Cherry Cheva, is an American author, screenwriter, comedian, and producer. She serves as an executive producer of Family Guy and a co-executive producer of  The Orville and  Resident Alien.

Early life
Chevapravatdumrong, a  Thai American, was born in Columbus, Ohio, and raised in Ann Arbor, Michigan, graduating from Huron High School in 1995. She majored in psychology at Yale University, where she wrote for The Yale Record, Yale's humor magazine. She later earned a Juris Doctor degree from New York University Law School, where she wrote for the comedic Law Revue. During law school, she spent her summers working at law firms and her winter breaks waiting tables at her parents' restaurant.

Career
She then moved to Los Angeles to pursue writing. Before working on Family Guy, she was a writer's assistant on Listen Up! She released two young adult novels, She's So Money and DupliKate, under the name Cherry Cheva.

Family Guy
She is now the only female writer on Family Guy (a fact mentioned in the episode "Roasted Guy"), and also a co-executive producer. Her last name was used in its entirety in the episode "And I'm Joyce Kinney" as the real last name of Joyce Kinney.

In the episode "Jesus, Mary and Joseph!", Peter breaks the fourth wall by rearranging the letters of her name in the opening credits to say "Chemotherapy vanguard vCr" (with one "r" left over, which he throws at Lois in a childlike tantrum when she points this out).

In the episode "Dead Dog Walking", Peter again breaks the fourth wall by saying that her address is 11700 Hollywood Way, North Hollywood, CA 91065, and that she is also a lawyer; this address does not exist. 

In the episode "No Giggity, No Doubt", Peter lists her name among examples of people (mainly other Family Guy characters, increasing in obscurity) who should go on an excursion with Meg: "Cherry Chevapravatdumrong, that's how that name is pronounced."

Episodes

As writer:
 "Sibling Rivalry" (2006)
 "Saving Private Brian" (2006)
 "Prick Up Your Ears" (2006)
 "Boys Do Cry" (2007)
 "Ocean's Three and a Half" (2009)
 "We Love You, Conrad" (2009)
 "Hannah Banana" (2009)
 "And Then There Were Fewer" (2010)
 "It's a Trap!" (2011)
 "The Blind Side" (2012)
 "Friends Without Benefits" (2012)
 "Quagmire's Quagmire" (2013)
 "Turkey Guys" (2014)
 "Candy, Quahog Marshmallow" (2016)
 "Gronkowsbees" (2017)
 "Dog Bites Bear" (2018)
 "Throw It Away" (2019)
 "Holly Bibble" (2020)

As executive story editor:
 "Chick Cancer" (2006)
 "Barely Legal" (2006)
 "The Tan Aquatic with Steve Zissou" (2007)
 "Airport '07" (2007)
 "Bill & Peter's Bogus Journey" (2007)
 "No Meals on Wheels" (2007)
 "McStroke" (2008)

As story editor:
 "You May Now Kiss the... Uh... Guy Who Receives" (2006)
 "The Griffin Family History" (2006)

As co-producer:
 "Back to the Woods" (2008)
 "Play it Again, Brian" (2008)
 "The Former Life of Brian" (2008)
 "Long John Peter" (2008)
 "Love, Blactually" (2008)
 "I Dream of Jesus" (2008)
 "Road to Germany" (2008)
 "Baby Not on Board" (2008)
 "The Man with Two Brians" (2008)
 "Family Gay" (2009)
 "420" (2009)
 "Three Kings" (2009)
 "Spies Reminiscent of Us" (2009)
 "Go, Stewie, Go" (2010)
 "Quagmire's Dad" (2010)
 "Something, Something, Something Dark Side" (2010)
 "Mr. & Mrs. Stewie" (2012)

The Orville
She would also work with MacFarlane on The Orville.
 "Firestorm" (Season 1, Episode 10)
 "Home" (Season 2, Episode 3)
 "Sanctuary" (Season 2, Episode 12)
 "Mortality Paradox" (Season 3, Episode 3)

Books
 with Alex Borstein

References

External links
 
 

Living people
Writers from Ann Arbor, Michigan
American women television writers
Yale College alumni
New York University School of Law alumni
Writers from Columbus, Ohio
American people of Thai descent
American writers
American women screenwriters
1977 births
The Yale Record alumni
21st-century American novelists
Novelists from Ohio
Novelists from Michigan
Screenwriters from Ohio
Screenwriters from Michigan
21st-century American women writers
American television writers
21st-century American screenwriters